John Hussey Delaval, 1st Baron Delaval (17 March 1728 – 17 May 1808), known as Sir John Delaval, Bt, between 1761 and 1783, was an English landowner and politician.

Background and education

Delaval was the son of Francis Blake Delaval, who inherited estates at Ford Castle, Northumberland from his mother Mary, née Blake, and at Seaton Delaval, Northumberland from his uncle Admiral George Delaval (1660–1723).  John's mother was Rhoda Apreece, through whom John inherited Doddington Hall, Lincolnshire.  He was educated at Westminster School and Pembroke College, Cambridge. Delaval bought his father's estates from his elder brother Sir Francis Blake Delaval (1727–1771) in exchange for an annuity, and developed the farming resources at Ford and the coal and mineral resources at Seaton.

His sister was Rhoda Delaval, an artist and wife of Edward Astley.

Political career

Delaval served as Member of Parliament for Berwick on Tweed 1754–1761, 1765–1774 and 1780–1786. He was created a baronet, of Seaton Delaval in the County of Northumberland, in the Baronetage of Great Britain in 1761, and in 1783 he was raised to the Peerage of Ireland as Baron Delaval, of Redford in the County of Wicklow. In 1786 he was further honoured when he was made Baron Delaval, of Seaton Delaval in the County of Northumberland, in the Peerage of Great Britain.

Personal life

Delaval's seat was at Seaton Delaval Hall, an 18th-century masterpiece by Sir John Vanbrugh.  Lord Delaval gave artist William Bell his patronage, in return for a series of portraits painted of him and his family, and two views of Seaton Delaval Hall.

Delaval married twice but his only son predeceased him aged just 19, and the baronetcy and baronies became extinct on his death in 1808. He was buried in St Paul's Chapel, Westminster Abbey.

He left his second wife Susannah Elizabeth a life interest in the Ford estate, after which it was to pass to his granddaughter Susan, and bequeathed his estates of Seaton Delaval and Doddington to his brother Edward Hussey Delaval (1729-1814). On the death of Edward in 1814, Doddington passed to Edward's wife and then to his daughter Sarah. Seaton Delaval passed to Jacob, the son of his deceased sister Rhoda, who had been married to Sir Edward Astley of Melton Constable in Norfolk.

References

Footnotes

Sources
 

1728 births
1808 deaths
Barons in the Peerage of Ireland
Peers of Ireland created by George III
Barons in the Peerage of Great Britain
Peers of Great Britain created by George III
Members of the Parliament of Great Britain for English constituencies
People educated at Westminster School, London
Alumni of Pembroke College, Cambridge
Burials at Westminster Abbey
English landowners
British MPs 1754–1761
British MPs 1761–1768
British MPs 1768–1774
British MPs 1780–1784
Whig members of the Parliament of Great Britain
People from Seaton Delaval